Jackson Matovu is an Anglican bishop who served in Uganda: he was the Bishop of Central Buganda, serving from 2001 to 2017.

References

21st-century Anglican bishops in Uganda
Living people
Uganda Christian University alumni
Year of birth missing (living people)
Anglican bishops of Central Buganda